Zhongshan (formerly transliterated as Chungshan Station until 2003) is a metro station in Taipei, Taiwan served by Taipei Metro. It is a transfer station between the Tamsui–Xinyi and s. The station opened on 28 March 1997 for traffic on the Tamsui-Xinyi line, and Songshan-Xindian line services opened on 15 November 2014. It is located in the middle of the underground Zhongshan Metro Mall and near the Shin Kong Mitsukoshi Department Store.

Station overview

The station is an underground structure with an island platform and four exits when Tamsui line opened. It is located at the intersection of Nanjing West Rd. and the Metro Park (near Chengde Rd. and Zhongshan North Rd.). It is also a transfer station with the Songshan line.

The Songshan line station added two additional exits and renovated two existing exits. The station is a four-level, underground station.

Public Art
Note: Exit 4 was recently reconstructed with transparent, self-cleaning glass to better integrate with nearby department stores.
The new Songshan line station has a theme of "Happy Transit".

History
The station was opened on 28 March 1997, as a terminus station of the Tamsui line until 25 December 1997. Later on, on 15 November 2014, Songshan line opened. On 20 July 2015, there was a knife attack injuring four.

Station layout

Other metro services
The station is an entrance to the Zhongshan Metro Mall, connecting (between this station and Shuanglian station).

Around the Station

 Linsen Park
 Museum of Contemporary Art Taipei

References

Tamsui–Xinyi line stations
Songshan–Xindian line stations
Railway stations opened in 1997
1997 establishments in Taiwan